The following is a list of programs broadcast by independent television stations in the United States.

Cartoons
 Tom and Jerry

Sitcoms
Sanford and Son (1970s)
 WKRP in Cincinnati (1981)

Lists of television series by network